The discography of American rapper and singer Rod Wave consists of four studio albums, five mixtapes, and twenty-two singles.

Rod Wave released his debut studio album, Ghetto Gospel,  on November 1, 2019. He followed it up with his second studio album, Pray 4 Love, which was released on April 3, 2020. His third studio album, SoulFly, was released on March 26, 2021, and became his first number-one album on the Billboard 200 chart.

Studio albums

EPs

Mixtapes

Singles

Other charted and certified songs

Guest appearances

Awards and nominations

Notes

References 

Discographies of American artists
Hip hop discographies